Viive Noor (born 7 October 1955) is an Estonian illustrator and curator.

In 1981, she graduated from State Art Institute of the Estonian SSR in fashion design and graphic art.

She is the founder and organizer of Tallinn Illustrations Triennial "The Power of Pictures" (2003, 2006, 2009, 2013, 2017).

She is working as a curator at the Estonian Children's Literature Centre.

She is a member of several organizations, including Estonian Artists' Association, Estonian Graphic Designers' Association.

References

Living people
1955 births
Estonian women illustrators
Estonian children's book illustrators
20th-century Estonian women artists
21st-century Estonian women artists
Estonian curators
Academic staff of the Estonian Academy of Arts
Recipients of the Order of the White Star, 5th Class
Estonian women curators
Artists from Tallinn